This is a list of adult fiction books that topped The New York Times Fiction Best Seller list in 1945. Seven books topped the list that year, the longest on top being The Green Years, which dominated the winter months (17 weeks). Other particularly popular titles included A Lion in the Streets (12 weeks on top), Captain from Castile (7 weeks) and The Black Rose (18 weeks including 4 in 1946).

See also
 Publishers Weekly list of bestselling novels in the United States in the 1940s

References

1945
.
1945 in the United States